Lexington Bridge may refer to:

Bridges:
 Lexington Bridge (Mississippi River), a bridge over the Mississippi River
 Lexington Bridge (Lexington, Missouri), a former bridge over the Missouri River

Other:
 Lexington Bridge (band), a British-Dutch-American boyband